UBX domain protein 6 is a protein in humans that is encoded by the UBXN6 gene.

References

Further reading

External links